Ashutosh Vijay Kotwal (born December 20, 1965) is an American particle physicist of Indian origin. He is the Fritz London Professor of Physics at Duke University, and conducts research in particle physics  related to W bosons and the Higgs boson and searches for new particles and forces.

Early life 

Kotwal was born in Mumbai, India, and attended schools in Calcutta, Lucknow, New Delhi and Mumbai. He then began studying at the University of Pennsylvania in 1983 on a full scholarship from the University, and graduated Summa cum Laude with dual degrees in Electrical Engineering from the Moore School and in Economics with finance major from the Wharton School in 1988. He was a Benjamin Franklin Scholar at Penn. He received his PhD in Physics from Harvard University in 1995.

Career 
After conducting post-doctoral research at Columbia University, Kotwal joined Duke University as a professor in 1999, where he is now the Fritz London Distinguished Professor of Physics  and has served as the Director of Particle Physics at the University. Additionally, Kotwal was in charge of a Higgs boson search team as part of the ATLAS experiment at the Large Hadron Collider, with the aim of proving the existence of the particle. Kotwal was part of the CERN team that announced the discovery of the Higgs boson in 2012. He conducts experiments at the Large Hadron Collider (LHC) as well as at Fermilab in Chicago. In addition to his research, Kotwal presently coordinates U.S. physicists in the global effort to build a new collider with 7 times higher energy than the LHC, and has collaborated with the Chinese and European groups in this effort.

Research 
Kotwal leads the world in measuring the mass of the W boson, which is connected to the Higgs boson, using the data from the CDF and D0 experiments at Fermilab. In 2012, he analyzed 1 million W boson events to measure its mass to an accuracy of 0.02%, then the world's most precise measurement, which in turn allowed him to predict the mass of the Higgs boson prior to its discovery in 2012. In 2022, he analyzed 4 million W boson events to measure its mass to an accuracy of 0.01%. This measurement is more precise than all previous measurements combined. It is in significant tension with the value expected from the Standard Model of particle physics, and may imply the existence of new principles of physics in nature.

Awards 
Kotwal was elected Fellow of the American Physical Society in 2008, and Fellow of the American Association for the Advancement of Science in 2012, for performing high-precision measurements that helped deduce the mass of the Higgs boson.
Kotwal is the recipient of the Outstanding Junior Investigator Award from the US Department of Energy, and the Alfred P. Sloan Foundation Fellowship. He has received the Dean's  Leadership Award from Duke University and is a Fellow of the Maharashtra Academy of Sciences, India.

References

External links
Duke Physics Profile

1965 births
Living people
21st-century American physicists
American academics of Indian descent
American people of Marathi descent
People from Pune
Particle physicists
Duke University faculty
Harvard University alumni
University of Pennsylvania School of Engineering and Applied Science alumni
Wharton School of the University of Pennsylvania alumni
People associated with CERN
Fellows of the American Association for the Advancement of Science
Fellows of the American Physical Society